The 2022 Rally Poland (also known as the ORLEN Rajd Polski - Rally Poland 2022) was a motor racing event for rally cars held from 10 June to 12 June 2022. It was the 78th edition of the Rally Poland. The event was the fourth round of the 2022 European Rally Championship.

Alexey Lukyanuk and Alexey Arnautov were the defending rally winners. Javier Pardo and Adrián Pérez were the defending winners in the ERC-2 category. Sami Pajari and Enni Mälkönen were the defending rally winners in the ERC-3 category and the ERC-3 Junior category.

Mikołaj Marczyk and Szymon Gospodarczyk won the rally, achieving their first victory in the ERC in their home event. Mārtiņš Sesks and Renars Francis won the ERC Open category. Robert Virves and Julia Thulin took the victory in the ERC-3 category. Laurent Pellier and Marine Pelamourgues won the ERC-4 and Junior ERC categories.

Background
The following crews entered the event competing for points in the European Rally Championship. The event was opened to crews competing in the ERC and its support categories, the Polish Rally Championship and any private crews. Overall of 76 crews entered the event, with 52 crews entering the ERC and 30 entering the Polish Rally Championship.

Entry list

Itinerary
All dates and times are CEST (UTC+2).

Report

ERC Rally2

Classification

Special stages

Championship standings

ERC Open

Classification

Special stages

Championship standings

References

Rally of Poland
2022 European Rally Championship season
2022 in rallying